Adam DeVine: Best Time of Our Lives is a 2019 Netflix stand-up comedy special by American comic Adam DeVine, his first Netflix stand-up special for Netflix. In Best Time of Our Lives, directed by Jay Karas in Adam's hometown of Omaha, Adam DeVine talks about teen awkwardness, celebrity encounters, his "Pitch Perfect" audition and more.

Release
It was released on June 18, 2019 on Netflix streaming.

References

External links
 
 

2019 television specials
Netflix specials
Stand-up comedy concert films
DeVine, Adam
Films directed by Jay Karas